Hong Kong people in Shanghai form a rapidly growing population. As late as October 2003, there were only 3,432 Hong Kong residents working in Shanghai, according to Shanghai municipal government statistics; however, by December of the following year, that number roughly doubled to 6,680.

Employment
60.2% work in the general services sector, 13.9% in manufacturing, 5% in real estate, 5.1% in finance and insurance, and 12.3% in other industries. Most work in managerial positions; they were either hired in Hong Kong and sent to Shanghai afterwards by Hong Kong or foreign firms, or established their own companies in Shanghai. However, the growth in their population is limited by competition from increasingly well-educated local employees, who demand much lower salaries.

With the rise in value of the renminbi, an increasing number of Hong Kong residents working in Shanghai who had previously been paid in foreign currencies such as United States dollars have begun to prefer receiving their salary in local currency instead. To control capital inflow, Hong Kong residents living in Shanghai, in common with residents from Macau and Taiwan, are limited to purchasing one house or apartment per Home Return Permit-holder (the so-called "one permit, one house" scheme), but the Shanghai municipal government suggested it may relax this restriction to three houses or apartments per permit-holder.

Associations
Associations representing the population include the Hong Kong Chamber of Commerce in Shanghai, established in 1996; as of 2007, it had roughly 700 members.

In popular culture
The 2006 TVB television series A Beautiful New World, starring Kristy Yang and Fan Bingbing, is among the better-known portrayals in popular culture.

See also
Shanghainese people in Hong Kong
The Hongkong and Shanghai Banking Corporation

References

Further reading

Hong Kong emigrants
Hong Kong society
Culture in Shanghai